Four Corners, Wisconsin may refer to:
Four Corners, Burnett County, Wisconsin, an unincorporated community in Burnett County
Four Corners, Douglas County, Wisconsin, an unincorporated community in Douglas County
Four Corners, Langlade County, Wisconsin, an unincorporated community in Langlade County
Four Corners, Monroe County, Wisconsin, an unincorporated community in Monroe County